Who Could Ask for Anything More? A Celebration of Ira Gershwin (24 November 1996) was a concert at the Royal Albert Hall, London, in aid of Mencap to celebrate the centenary of Ira Gershwin's birth. It was initially broadcast on BBC Radio 2 (UK) on 7 December 1996, on television on BBC Two (UK) on 31 December 1996 and A&E Networks (US) on 9 August 1997.

Background 
The show was produced by Ian Martin and directed by Paul Kafno. Those performing included: Peter Barkworth; Tracie Bennett; Sarah Brightman; Tim Flavin; Maria Friedman; Greg Horsman; Derek Jacobi; Nigel Planer; Michael Praed; Helen Shapiro and Dave Willetts. It was hosted by Charles Dance and David Soul.

Present at the event were Ira Gershwin's family and the then Prime Minister John Major.

Songs 
Songs performed for the show included:

Part 1 
 "I Got Rhythm" – The Gershwin All Stars
 "The Saga of Jenny" – Ruthie Henshall
 "They Can't Take That Away from Me" – Paul Nicholas
 "I Don't Think I'll Fall In Love Today" – Gerard Casey and Linzi Hateley
 "Love Is Here To Stay" – Debbie Gravitte
 "The Man I Love" - Megan Kelly and Paul Gyngell (with dancers Lisa Pavane and Greg Horsman)
 "Love Walked In" – Shona Lindsay and Gareth Snook

Part 2 
 "Shoes With Wings On" - The Gershwin All Stars
 "Shall We Dance?" – Fiona Benjamin and Tim Flavin
 "My Ship" – Linzi Hateley and Grania Renihan
 "Delishious" – Stephanie Pope
 "Embraceable You" – Marti Webb
 "The Man That Got Away" – Lorna Luft
 "Strike Up the Band" – John Barrowman and the company

Part 3 
 "Instrumental medley" – The London Gershwin Orchestra
 "But Not For Me" – Fiona Benjamin
 "I Can't Be Bothered Now" – Tim Flavin and The Crazy For You Dancers
 "I Can't Get Started" – Daniel Benzali and Liz Robertson
 "How Long Has This Been Going On?" – B.J. Crosby
 "There Is No Music" - Lorna Dallas and Don Pippa

Part 4 
 "I've Got a Crush on You" - Michael McCarthy and Grania Renihan
 "Little Jazz Bird" – Maureen McGovern
 "It Ain't Necessarily So" – Victor Trent Cook
 "He Loves and She Loves" – Larry Adler and The Gershwin All-Stars, introduced by Leslie Caron
 "Heaven on Earth" – Michael McCarthy and Company

Notes

References

External links 
The following archive material relating to the concert is held in the Royal Albert Hall Events collection (RAHE):
 Programme, ref: RAHE/1/1996/151
 Poster, ref: RAHE/2/1996/1
 5 sheets of colour transparencies, ref: RAHE/3/17/20
 Handbill, ref: RAHE/6/1996/37

Concerts at the Royal Albert Hall
English-language radio programs
English-language television shows
Tribute concerts in the United Kingdom